Badanoo is a village in Thathri tehsil of Doda district in Jammu and Kashmir. It is located at least 36 kilometres from its district headquarters. This village is the part of Patwar Halqa Jangalwar.

Badanoo village is located in the upper reaches of Thathri and is surrounded by forests that have the presence of leopards and other wild animals.

Etymology
The word Badanoo is derived from the Kashmiri word "Ba'd Ra'in" (بَڈ رٰایٔں) which means Great Princess.

Prominent figures
Taskeen Badanvi, a prominent poet affiliated with Jammu and Kashmir Academy of Art, Culture and Languages.

References

Villages in Doda district